Lindela Rowland Ndlovu (died 18 November 2015) was a Zimbabwean biochemist and Vice-Chancellor of the National University of Science and Technology. He was also a founding member of the Zimbabwe Academy of Science and served as the Honorary President of the South African Academy of Animal Science.

He served as a Professor of Animal Science at the University of Limpopo in South Africa, and for nine years was Dean of Faculty of Agriculture at the University of Zimbabwe. He spent several decades in the United States studying animal science. Ndlovu earned his PhD degree in 1985 at the University of Guelph, in Ontario, Canada.

In 1995, Ndlovu helped initiate a research project with J. D. Reed from the University of Wisconsin into the ecological biochemistry of proanthocyanidins. In 2007, he was the recipient of the Gold Medal for Research from the South African Academy for Animal Science.

Bibliography

Death
He died suddenly at Gallen House Medical Centre, Bulawayo, on 18 November 2015.

References

2015 deaths
Expatriate academics in the United States
Academic staff of the National University of Science and Technology, Zimbabwe
Zimbabwean expatriates in South Africa
Zimbabwean scientists
Year of birth missing
Academic staff of the University of Limpopo